Ulambie is a rural locality of Walgett Shire and a civil parish of Baradine County, New South Wales. Ulambie is on the Namoi River at 30°05′54″S 148°12′04″E between Walgett, New South Wales and Come By Chance.

References

Localities in New South Wales
Geography of New South Wales